Zoe Telford is an English actress.

Early life and education
Telford was born in Norwich, England. She started training as a dancer at a very young age and continued until she was in her 20s. She attended the Italia Conti Academy of Theatre Arts. Her first break was on the show The Bill, a police drama, in 1993.

Career
After guesting in The Bill, Telford appeared as a guest on several British TV shows before her first major role in the mini-series The Last Train (1999). One of her first recognisable works was in the first season of Channel 4's Teachers (2001) in which she played Maggie, a police officer and girlfriend to the character Simon Casey, played by Andrew Lincoln.

In the TV movie Men Only (2001), she played Alice, a nurse who was gang-raped by a group of men known to her and with whom she had flirted, played by, among others, Stephen Moyer and Martin Freeman. She played the social worker Christina Leith in Real Men (2003), a two part TV drama that tackled the subject of paedophilia. Telford appeared as Eva Braun in the 2003 Emmy-nominated Hitler: The Rise of Evil opposite Robert Carlyle. The TV movie was broadcast in the US on CBS with some controversy as it reportedly "likened the nation's acceptance of the Bush administration's pre-emptive strike on Iraq to the climate of fear that allowed Hitler to prosper". Her screen time was short since the film focused more on the events leading up to the Final Solution.

In Agatha Christie's Poirot's Death on the Nile (2004), Telford played Rosalie Otterbourne, one of the cruise passengers alongside Emily Blunt, James Fox, and David Suchet. She played Alison Jackman, a young trainee at the fictional PR firm of Prentiss McCabe headed by Stephen Fry in the BBC's Absolute Power (2003–2005), and trauma doctor Jane Cameron in The Golden Hour (2005), a four part ITV miniseries.

In 2006 Telford played Emily Trefusis in Agatha Christie's Marple's The Sittaford Mystery, produced jointly by Granada and WGBH-Boston. The show was broadcast in the US as part of the PBS Mystery! anthology series and marked her first collaboration with Laurence Fox. She was also in three different movies in the same year: Beau Brummell: This Charming Man, The Painted Veil (starring Naomi Watts), and The Truth (starring Elizabeth McGovern). She played Abigail Thomas, Assistant Private Secretary (APS) to the Sovereign, in the eight episode ITV series The Palace (2008). The show was originally conceived as an answer to The West Wing but underwent several script changes and, according to Telford, "became a very different thing to what it originally started out as". In 2008 she worked for the first time with Juliet Stevenson in the three part ITV series Place of Execution; the show was broadcast in the US in the following year as part of the PBS Mystery! anthology.
 
In 2009 Telford appeared in several other procedural drama shows including Law & Order: UK (2009), the second season of Criminal Justice (2009) where she played the defence barrister for Maxine Peake’s character Julie, and Collision (2009) which was broadcast in the US under the PBS Masterpiece Contemporary. In the same year she appeared as a freelance tabloid reporter in two episodes of the comedy series The Thick of It (2009). In 2010 she appeared in Foyle's War (2010), shown in the US under the PBS Mystery! series. She also appeared in Episodes 2 and 3 of the first season of the BBC's Sherlock (2010) as Sarah, a physician colleague and love interest of Dr. John Watson, played by her Men Only co-star Martin Freeman. Telford's appearance as Freya Carlisle in Lewis (2011) reunited her with Juliet Stevenson and James Fox; while her appearance as Eva Storr in the BBC's Room at the Top (2012) reunited her with her Criminal Justice  co-star Maxine Peake. She played the newly created character Claire Sutton, a policy adviser, in the 2013 remake of Yes, Prime Minister.

Telford won a Special Commendation Award for her role in the film Greyhawk at the 2014 Edinburgh International Film Festival, where the film premiered. She plays Paula, a beleaguered housewife who helps Mal, a blind veteran, find his dog.

She appeared in the Series 17 opening episodes of Silent Witness (2015) as DCI Jane de Freitas.  Her role as Bella Cross, the daughter of one of the main suspects in the first season of Unforgotten (2015) reunited her with Nicola Walker, her former co-star in The Last Train. She played the tragic Clara Haber in the first season of National Geographic's Genius – Einstein (2017). She appeared in other British TV series including Death in Paradise (2018) as Michelle Devaux, a professional poker player, and Grantchester (2019) as Professor Jean Simms, Head of the Computing Department at the University of Cambridge, set in the 1950s. She played Sarah Bradford, the missing wife of DI David Bradford in the TV series London Kills (2019), produced by Acorn TV and acquired by the BBC for 2020 release in the UK.

Personal life
Telford has a son (b. 2010 or 2011) and a daughter (b. 2015).  She lives in Oxfordshire.

Filmography

References

External links
 

Living people
English television actresses
Actors from Norwich
20th-century English actresses
21st-century English actresses
Alumni of the Italia Conti Academy of Theatre Arts
1973 births